Esther Kalenzi is a Ugandan social entrepreneur and founder of 40 Days Over 40 Smiles, a charity organization that supports vulnerable children and helps them access quality education. She won the 2013 Young Achievers Award in the Heroes category.

Early life
Esther is the last born of four children. She went to Nabisunsa Girls' Secondary School, Aga Khan High School and Uganda Christian University, where she graduated with a bachelor's degree in mass communication.

Awards and recognition
Commonwealth Point of Light Award for educating vulnerable children
 2013 Heroes Young Achievers Award

References

Living people
Year of birth missing (living people)
Place of birth missing (living people)
Founders of charities
Social entrepreneurs
21st-century Ugandan women
Uganda Christian University alumni
People educated at Nabisunsa Girls' Secondary School